Expressway S10 or express road S10 (in Polish droga ekspresowa S10) is major road in Poland which, when completed, will serve as a direct route between Szczecin and Warsaw. It has been planned to run from the junction with Motorway A6 on the eastern outskirts of Szczecin, through Bydgoszcz and Toruń, to a junction with express road S50 near Płock, west of Warsaw. As of November 2017,  of road were built. According to current plans, the bulk of this road will be built after 2020. However, key stretches with high traffic densities may be built earlier.

Exit List

References 

Expressways in Poland
Proposed roads in Poland